Barešani (Macedonian Cyrillic: Барешани) is a village  away from Bitola, which is the second largest city in Macedonia. It used to be part of the former municipality of Bistrica.

The name comes from Златни Анови (Golden Anovi). The story goes that there was a money mint in the village that made bronze & golden coins and had a rest stop with an AN (hotel type accommodation) so Барешани (Barešani) means Golden Anovi (golden hotel/accommodation).

The AN is usually a two-story building, with the bottom used to house the animals of travelers and the top part for travelers.

Demographics
Barešani is attested in the Ottoman defter of 1467/68 as a village in the vilayet of Manastir. The majority of the inhabitants attested bore typical Slavic anthroponyms, with a minority also exhibiting Albanian anthroponyms, such as Todor Arnaut, Gjergj prift and Lazor son of Niksha.

According to the 2002 census, the village had a total of 205 inhabitants. Ethnic groups in the village include:

Macedonians 204
Others 1

References

External links

Villages in Bitola Municipality